Men Are That Way is a 1939 German drama film directed by Arthur Maria Rabenalt and starring Hertha Feiler, Hans Söhnker and Hans Olden. The film's sets were designed by the art director Willi Herrmann. It was remade by Rabenalt in Austria as Arena of Fear (1959).

Plot
An attractive female dance student becomes involved in the circus world, falls in love and takes it up professionally.

Cast

References

External links

1939 drama films
German drama films
Films of Nazi Germany
Films directed by Arthur Maria Rabenalt
Films based on German novels
Circus films
Terra Film films
German black-and-white films
1930s German films
1930s German-language films